Alex Gordon is a Major League Baseball] player who played for the Kansas City Royals.

Alex Gordon may also refer to:
Alex Gordon (police agent), a police infiltrator
Alex Gordon (gridiron football) (born 1964), former NFL linebacker
Alex Gordon, former collegiate basketball player, currently with Chorale Roanne in France
Alex Gordon (footballer) (1940–1996), Scottish footballer
Alex Gordon (writer-producer) (1922–2003), British writer and film producer
Alex Gordon (rugby union) (born 1991), American rugby union footballer
Sir Alex Gordon (architect) (1917–1999), Welsh architect
Alex Gordon (priest) (born 1949), Provost of St Andrew's Cathedral, Inverness

See also
Alexander Gordon (disambiguation)